Park Lane is a rugby stadium in Whitefield near Bury, Greater Manchester, England. It is the home of Sedgley Park R.U.F.C. and, from 2003–10 and 2015, Swinton rugby league club.

History
Sedgley Park R.U.F.C. moved to Park Lane in 1955. A large, two-storey clubhouse was completed in 1982 and was extended in the 1990s. Also in the 1990s the club turned its two pitches into one and purchased a field, just across the road, to provide three more much needed pitches.

Sport in the Metropolitan Borough of Bury
Rugby union stadiums in England
Sports venues in Greater Manchester
Sports venues completed in 1955
1955 establishments in England